Rob Swift (born Robert Aguilar; May 14, 1972), is an American hip hop DJ and turntablist. He was an original member of the turntablist group The X-Ecutioners until 2004. He has also released numerous solo albums and collaborated with various artists, including Mike Patton, Patton's project Peeping Tom, Dan the Automator and Handsome Boy Modeling School, Lords of Acid, Portugal. The Man, and Herbie Hancock.

From January 2010 through May 2015, Swift hosted the online hip-hop radio show Dope on Plastic on Scion A/V Streaming Radio 17.

In August 2012, Swift became the resident DJ for a new late night college sports TV talk show on ESPNU called UNITE.

In September 2014, Swift became a Professor at the New School for Liberal Arts in New York City. He is currently teaching the DJ Skills & Styles course and his research includes Hip Hop History and culture as well as Musical Composition via turntable techniques.

Early life
Born and raised in Jackson Heights, Queens, by Colombian heritage, Swift (born Robert Aguilar) began DJing at the age of 12 by watching his father and brother. “My dad was a salsa and merengue DJ. My brother learned how to scratch and do all the hip hop deejaying stuff on my dad’s equipment (without his permission) and I’d sit there and watch him. When I entered the sixth grade, I decided I wanted to learn.” So unlike those who were influenced through hip hop records, DMC and NMS tapes, or movies, Swift educated himself with the classic turntable beats of the early 1980s New York City playground pioneers while listening to funk and jazz at home. “My older brother exposed me to all that,” he says. “All the stuff I create as a DJ is rooted in the songs that I heard from Bob James, Herbie Hancock and James Brown to Quincy Jones and old DJs like Grandmaster Flash and Grand Wizard Theodore. That’s where my roots are.”

In 1990, Swift enrolled as a student at Baruch College in New York City and in 1995, graduated with a degree in psychology. “While I was deejaying I pursued college. Speech class and English serve a purpose, you know?” His education can be said to translate into his cerebral style of scratching, juggling and making music.

Career
In 1991, Swift joined the groundbreaking turntablist crew the X-Men aka X-ecutioners (Roc Raida, Total Eclipse, and Mista Sinista). Also in 1991, he won the DMC East Coast title. In 2001, he was featured in the DJ documentary Scratch (Palm Pictures). He has appeared on ESPN, the Late Show with David Letterman and Sesame Street.

In 2008, Swift was the first hip hop DJ invited to perform at the Savannah Jazz Festival in Georgia. He has collaborated with artists from many genres including Blue Man Group, Herbie Hancock, Scritti Politti, Bob James, Linkin Park, Good Charlotte, Dan The Automator, Fat Joe, Cypress Hill and Bill Laswell. He currently works solo, as part of the group Ill Insanity (featuring former X-Men Total Eclipse and Precision), or collaborating with other like-minded artists.

Since January 2010, Swift has hosted the online hip-hop radio show Dope on Plastic on Scion A/V Streaming Radio 17 on which he plays mixes and interviews with guest turntablists. Guests have included J-Smoke & DJ Element, Tim Martells, and DJ Platurn.

In February 2010, Rob Swift's solo 18-song turntablism-classical music fusion album The Architect was released by Mike Patton on Ipecac Recordings, which Swift dedicated to Roc Raida who died in 2009. In June 2008, Swift's girlfriend played a piece by Chopin for him on her iPod while he was shaving. Swift said, "For some reason on that day in my bathroom, my heart was ready to embrace this genre." In July, he began work on a new album and a month or two into the recording process, he said, "I listened back to see how to album was starting to shape up. After sitting down and listening to it I started realizing that I was being influenced by this genre of classical that I had a new found love for ...  I then started creating my music in a way that was reflective of the way that the composers created their pieces. So I started working in movements. I was using sounds and then reintroducing the sounds in other songs. And I sat down and went, 'wow!' All this time, artists like Mozart, Chopin, Beethoven were influencing me on this album subconsciously without me knowing. So once I realized that, then I decided that this album would be a take on what I feel classical composers like Mozart and Chopin would have done if they had turntables." One guest MC, Breez Evahflowin, rhymes about the album's concepts on "Principio" and "Ultimo".

On March 20, 2012, Swift released the album Roc for Raida, a collection of songs (some unreleased) and battle style routines that defined the late fellow X-Ecutioner Roc Raida as an artist, lost interview archives (from John Carluccio), and other material, with proceeds going to Raida's family.

In August 2012, Swift became the resident DJ for a new late night college sports TV talk show on ESPNU called UNITE. On his blog, DJ Qbert, reported Swift as saying, "Never would I have thought as a 12-year old that DJing would take me this far. It is something that I have always done out of pure love. Now I’m being contracted for a full-time TV position and paid to do something I truly love. It just goes to show, when you do something for the right reasons, the right things happen. Stay positive, stay true to what you love, don’t compromise your craft and never give up on your dreams."

In September 2014, Swift became a Professor at the New School for Liberal Arts in New York City. He is currently teaching the course Dj Skills & Styles
and his research includes Hip Hop History and culture as well as Musical Composition via turntable techniques.

Discography

Albums
 1997 Soulful Fruit (original release on Stones Throw Records)
 1999 The Ablist
 2001 Airwave Invasion
 2002 Sound Event
 2003 Under the Influence
 2003 Who Sampled This?
 2004 OuMuPo 2
 2005 War Games
 2006 Back to the Beat
 2006 Pure Moods
 2008 Dust to Dust
 2010 The Architect
 2012 Roc for Raida
 2013 Tupac and Biggie Remix

Film appearances
 2001 Scratch
 2007 As the Table Turn (documentary)
 2009 As the Technics Spin (documentary)
 2011 DJ Rob Swift - Live! The Documented Movement (documentary)
 2013 Master Class w/ DJ Rob Swift (documentary)

References

External links
Official website
Video interview with Rob Swift
Kyle Gilkeson, "DJ Rob Swift on his Foray into Classical Music", Alarm magazine, November 8, 2010
Platform8470 interview - February 2009

1972 births
Baruch College alumni
American people of Colombian descent
American DJs
Living people
People from Jackson Heights, Queens
Ipecac Recordings artists
Stones Throw Records artists